Johann Heinrich Friedrich Müller (20 February 1738 – 8 August 1815) was a German actor, writer and Lustspiel poet.

Life 
Born in Aderstedt, Müller is said to have been called Schröder or Schroeter at first. After the early death of his father, he attended the Latina (school) of the Franckesche Stiftungen in Halle (Saale) from 1749. When he accidentally set a fire there, he fled from this institution. Puppeteers, coming from Lauchstädt, had a lasting effect on Müller. He played the play they gave him on a home-made theatre stage, which exploded and caught fire when gunpowder was ignited.

Müller fled to his brother, a priest in Halle's surroundings. The latter sent him to the cathedral school in Magdeburg.

In 1767–1768, Müller wrote the numbers 11-13 of the Singspiel-libretto Bastien und Bastienne, which was set to music by Wolfgang Amadeus Mozart.

As a teacher, Müller taught Vladimir Odoyevsky, and perhaps John Field, Alexander Griboyedov, and Alexander Alyabyev.

Family 

Müller's children included:
 Josephine Hortense Müller (31 March 1766 Vienna – 1808 ibid), 1782–1799 court actress, married the painter Heinrich Friedrich Füger in 1790.
 Friedrich Josef Müller (19 December 1768 Vienna – 9 September 1834 ibid), 1785–1804 Court actor, afterwards k. k. servant,
 Anna Müller (1771 Vienna – 11 February 1842 ibid), actress, member of the court theatre from 1798.
 Victoria Müller (1781 Vienna – 17 February 1802 ibid), actress.

Work 
 Der Ball, oder der versetzte Schmuck. Ein Lustspiel worin ein Hannswurst erscheint in zween Aufzügen, Vienna 1770 (numerized)
 Stirbt der Fuchs, so gilt’s den Balg, Ländliches Gemälde, Vienna 1770
 Vier Narren in einer Person. Vorspiel, Vienna 1770
 Die unähnlichen Brüder, Lustspiel, Vienna 1771
 Gräfinn Tarnow. Ein Originaldrama in fünf Aufzügen, Vienna 1771 (numerised)
 Die Insel der Liebe, oder Amor, Erforscher der Herzen, Lustspiel, Vienna 1773
 Präsentirt das Gewehr, Lustspiel, Vienna 1775 
 Genaue Nachrichten von den beyden k. k. Schaubühnen und anderen öffentlichen Ergötzlichkeiten in Wien, Vienna 1772
 Genaue Nachrichten von den beyden kaiserl. königl. Schaubühnen in Wien, und den vorzüglichsten Theatern der übrigen kais. kön. Erbländer. Zweyter Theil. Nebst einem Lustspiele, Vienna 1773 (numerized)
 Tagebuch von beyden k. k. Theatern in Wien, Vienna 1775
 J. H. F. Müllers Abschied von der k. k. Hof- und National-Schaubühne. Mit einer kurzen Biographie seines Lebens und einer gedrängten Geschichte des hiesigen Hoftheaters, Vienna 1802 (numerized)

Further reading 
 Constantin von Wurzbach: Müller, Johann Heinrich Friedrich . In Biographisches Lexikon des Kaiserthums Oesterreich. 19th part. Kaiserlich-königliche Hof- und Staatsdruckerei, Vienna 1868, .
 Constantin von Wurzbach: Müller, Friedrich Joseph (valet) In Biographisches Lexikon des Kaiserthums Oesterreich. 19th part. Kaiserlich-königliche Hof- und Staatsdruckerei, Vienna 1868, 
 Constantin von Wurzbach: Müller, Josephine (Member of theHofbühne). In Biographisches Lexikon des Kaiserthums Oesterreich. 19th part. Kaiserlich-königliche Hof- und Staatsdruckerei, Vienna 1868, 
 Maria Murland: Joh. Heinr. Fr. Müller. In Historische Kommission für die Provinz Sachsen und für Anhalt (Hrsg.): Mitteldeutsche Lebensbilder. 3rd volume Lebensbilder des 18. und 19. Jahrhunderts. Selbstverlag, Magdeburg 1928,

References

External links 
 

18th-century German male actors
1738 births
1815 deaths
People from Harz (district)